Montreal School Board can refer to

 Commission scolaire de Montréal, the French language school board
 English Montreal School Board, the English language school board